This is a list of the Philippine Basketball Association players by total three-point field goals made.

Statistics accurate as of January 16, 2023.

See also
List of Philippine Basketball Association players

References

External links
Philippine Basketball Association All-time Leaders in Most 3-Pointers Made – PBA Online.net

Scoring leaders, 3-point, Career